Scott Benjamin Logan (born August 14, 1978) is an American independent singer-songwriter in the Contemporary Christian Music genre. Originally from Portland, Maine, Scott has been involved the music scene since the age of 15. After playing with a number of bands, Scott branched out and began a solo career in the Fall of 2008. Since then he has been on several national tours, recorded his first EP, and most recently saw the release of his first national radio single, "Representin'". In February 2010, Scott recorded his first full-length album titled "So Much More" which released on May 18, 2010. Scott plans to spend some quality time in the studio in early 2012 to begin work on his second album. Scott currently resides in Chattanooga, Tennessee, and works out of Nashville, Tennessee.

Career

Three Days Down
Scott grew up in Portland, Maine as an only child and loved music right from the start. Scott occasionally sang in church growing up, and at the age of 12 played his first guitar chords. Scott's interest in guitar continued to grow as he spent many of his summers inside the house practicing chords and scales as he grew up through adolescence. He started writing music as soon as possible and was in his first band at the age of 15. Scott played lead guitar for a local Christian rock band and had the opportunity to play all around the state of Maine performing for youth groups. In 1997, Scott and some friends formed the band Three Days Down. During the next several years Scott got to travel all around the northeast and perform for audiences large and small. As the lead singer of Three Days Down, Scott had the opportunity to perform concerts with artists such as Downhere, Justin McRoberts, Geoff Moore, Sara Groves, and Seventh Day Slumber.

New Mercy Morning
Due to the inevitable name confusion with popular bands Three Doors Down and Three Days Grace, in 2004 Three Days Down became known as New Mercy Morning. Along with his friends and bandmates, Scott recorded two full-length albums that did very well for the band and brought the group much indie success. Scott continued to perform around New England for the next 4 years until it was time for him to take his music to the next step.

Solo career
Scott Logan started his solo career in October 2008 and started to re-invent his style by adding some new and different elements into his music. In Summer of 2009, Scott worked with producer Dan Merrill to record his first solo EP. Scott enlisted the help of several area musicians to play on the album, including a couple of former bandmates from New Mercy Morning. In February 2010, Scott recorded his first full-length album titled "So Much More" which released on May 18, 2010. It includes 10 songs. In early 2012, Scott plans to begin work on a second solo album.

Personal life
In addition to being a singer-songwriter, Scott has also been a worship leader within the non-denominational church organization Calvary Chapel. Scott travels across the country and occasionally tours through Calvary Chapel churches to lead worship as well as perform concerts.

Scott was born Scott Logan Anderson. To avoid name confusion with his father (who is also named Scott Anderson) who was also a member of Three Days Down and New Mercy Morning, Scott legally changed his name to Scott Benjamin Logan.

Scott married his wife Shanon in 2005, who became his inspiration for his other new radio single called, "Color." While working out of Nashville, they have made Chattanooga, TN their new home.

References
This article adapted from Scott Logan's website, ScottLoganMusic.com, bio page, used with permission.

External links 
 ScottLoganMusic.com
 Scott Logan on Myspace

1978 births
Living people
American singer-songwriters
Musicians from Portland, Maine
Singers from Maine
Writers from Portland, Maine
Songwriters from Maine
21st-century American singers